Herrerías is a municipality located in the autonomous community of Cantabria, Spain. According to the 2007 census, the city has a population of 715 inhabitants.

Towns
Bielva (capital)
Cabanzón
Cades
Camijanes
Casamaría
Puente el Arrudo
Rábago

References

External links
Herrerías - Cantabria 102 Municipios

Municipalities in Cantabria